Agoncillo, officially the Municipality of Agoncillo,  is a 4th class municipality in the province of Batangas, Philippines. According to the 2020 census, it has a population of 39,101 people.

Etymology
The town got its name after Felipe Agoncillo, a native of Taal, Batangas.

History
Agoncillo was originally a part of Lemery. In 1945, an executive committee was formed by the first appointed Mayor Jacinto Mendoza Sr. to prepare a resolution, requesting the Secretary of the Interior, Malacañan Palace, through the provincial board to detach and separate 11 barrios and be created a municipality.

Through Executive Order 140 issued by President Elpidio Quirino, the Municipality of Pansipit was created. But the Municipal Council of Lemery passed a resolution requesting for the revocation and suspension of the said creation. Thus, another executive order was endorsed for the conduct of a plebiscite to ascertain the true sentiments of the residents regarding the issue of separation.

Finally, on April 17, 1949, Executive Order No. 212 was issued by President Quirino, lifting the suspension and thereby, authorizing the immediate organization of the Municipality under the name of Agoncillo, in honor of Don Felipe Agoncillo, a native of Taal and one of the first Filipino representatives to the Spanish Cortes.

Geography

It is bounded in the east by approximately  lakeshore of Taal Lake, south by San Nicolas and Taal, north by Laurel, and is separated by the Pansipit River on the west by Lemery.

According to the Philippine Statistics Authority, the municipality has a land area of  constituting  of the  total area of Batangas.

Barangays
Agoncillo is politically subdivided into 21 barangays.

Climate

Demographics

In the 2020 census, Agoncillo had a population of 39,101.

Economy

Government
The current set of local government officials were elected in 2022 and their term will expire in 2025. The municipal mayor is Atty. Cinderella Reyes, while the vice mayor is Daniel Reyes, the mayor's husband and predecessor. The municipal council is composed of Sarah Reyes, Joel Landicho, Jerwyn Landicho, Kidlat Caringal, Embet Catena, Joel Paras De Chavez, Viong Cacao, and Gido Lacap.

Gallery

References

External links

[ Philippine Standard Geographic Code]

Municipalities of Batangas
Populated places on Taal Lake
Establishments by Philippine executive order